Qeshlaq-e Olya (also Romanized as Qeshlāq-e ‘Olyā; also known as Qeshlāq) is a village in Khodabandehlu Rural District, in the Central District of Sahneh County, Kermanshah Province, Iran. At the 2006 census, its population was 465, in 102 families.

References 

Populated places in Sahneh County